Pitcairn (1971–2004) was an Irish-bred Thoroughbred racehorse who competed in four countries before retiring to stud where he became Champion Sire in Britain.

Background and pedigree

Bred at Airlie Stud in Ireland, Pitcairn was bought as a yearling at Ballsbridge for IR£3,200 by the British Bloodstock Agency for Sandy Struthers. The relatively modest price was possibly due to an unattractive skin condition. He was sired by Petingo (incidentally the leading Great British sire the season prior to his son winning the title) who also produced 1978 Oaks winner Fair Salinia and 1979 horse of the year Troy. Pitcairn's full brother, Valley Forge, finished third in the 1978 Irish St Leger as well as winning the Blandford Stakes of the same year while their full sister, Dingle Bay, produced classy stayer and successful National Hunt stallion Assessor. Half sister Eljazzi produced another Blandford Stakes winner in Chiang Mai who herself produced Chinese White, the Champion older Irish mare of 2010. She is also the grand dam of prominent sires Invincible Spirit and Kodiac. Their dam, Border Bounty finished second in 1968's Musidora Stakes, Park Hill Stakes and Yorkshire Oaks while her half sister, Brief Chorus, who finished third in the 1966 renewal of the latter named race, was also the great grand-dam of Bachir who won the Irish, French and UAE equivalents of the 2000 guineas.

Racing career

2yo season

Pitcairn made a winning debut on 9 May 1973 in the five furlong Warminster Stakes at Salisbury which he took by four lengths. He followed up with a victory over six furlongs in Kempton's Nightingale Stakes beating two previous winners. Pitcairn would not win any of his remaining five races for the season but he did run with credit in his final three starts. After finishing third to the talented Giacometti in Doncaster's Champagne Stakes, he was a two and a half length runner up to the season's leading juvenile, Habat, in Newmarket's Middle Park Stakes while wearing a hood for the first time. Pitcairn then returned to Newmarket to finish runner up to Cellini in the Dewhurst Stakes. He would surpass his latter two conquerors during the following season.

3yo season

Pitcairn began his 1974 season with an eight length victory from Deerslayer in Epsom's Blue Riband Trial Stakes. This was followed by a solid effort on his return to Ireland in the Irish 2000 Guineas where after making the running, he was caught in the final strides by Furry Glen and beaten a short head. A fever of 104 ruled him out of the Epsom Derby, a race for which he was as low as 16/1. Pitcairn returned to action in the Sussex Stakes at Goodwood. Prior to the race, trainer John Dunlop was not convinced that his charge would be at his best. During the race, he was slow to break and unable to adopt his usual front running tactics so in light of his lack of fitness, the sixth-place finish was not without merit. He returned to winning ways next time out when taking the Hungerford Stakes at Newbury by three lengths from the useful Midsummer Star. Eight days later, Pitcairn added a third and final victory to his seasonal tally when beating his two rivals in the Goodwood Mile despite hanging left. Following a short break, Pitcairn finished a respectable third behind Giacometti and Northern Gem on his sole attempt over ten furlongs in Newmarket's Champion Stakes. His season closed with a rather tepid fifth in the Prix de la Forêt at Longchamp before finishing second behind the two-year-old and subsequent Italian Oaks winner Carnauba in the Premio Chiusura.

Stud career

Upon retirement, Pitcairn stood at Lord Harrington's Greenmount Stud in Limerick at £1,250 no foal, no fee. However, he was not especially popular among broodmare nominations was exported to Japan in 1978. Nevertheless, he was crowned Champion Sire of Great Britain and Ireland in 1980 thanks largely to the efforts of Ela-Mana-Mou and Cairn Rouge.

Notable progeny

c = colt, f = filly, g = gelding''

Pedigree

References

1971 racehorse births
2004 racehorse deaths
Racehorses bred in Ireland
Racehorses trained in the United Kingdom
Thoroughbred family 7-a
British Champion Thoroughbred Sires